Joseph Leo Loftus (24 January 1906 in Ferryhill – 23 October 1992 in Durham Central) was an English footballer who played as an inside left. He made over 200 Football League appearances in the years before the Second World War.

Career
Loftus played locally for Chilton Lane United and Cornforth United before joining Bishop Auckland. Loftus moved to Willington and played as an amateur for Stockport County. Loftus joined South Shields in July 1926. He moved on to Nottingham Forest in 1929. Bob Hewison signed Loftus for £100 in June 1932 for Bristol City. Loftus moved to Gillingham in August 1935. Loftus briefly dropped into non league football with Burton Town in October 1935 where he scored 31 goals in 1935–36. Loftus returned to League football joining Barrow in June 1936. In 1936–37 he  made 27 appearances scoring 9 goals with 8 goals coming in an 18 match spell from January onwards after an indifferent start to the campaign.

References

1906 births
1992 deaths
People from Ferryhill
Footballers from County Durham
English footballers
Association football forwards
English Football League players
Bishop Auckland F.C. players
Willington A.F.C. players
Stockport County F.C. players
South Shields F.C. (1889) players
Nottingham Forest F.C. players
Bristol City F.C. players
Gillingham F.C. players
Burton Town F.C. players
Barrow A.F.C. players